Rustam Ayvarovich Bakov (born 11 May 1983) is a former Russian football midfielder.

Club career
He played in the Russian Football National League for PFC Spartak Nalchik in 2003.

External links
 
 
 Career summary by sportbox.ru

1983 births
Sportspeople from Nalchik
Living people
Russian footballers
Association football midfielders
FC Lokomotiv Moscow players
PFC Spartak Nalchik players
FC Dynamo Stavropol players
FC Mashuk-KMV Pyatigorsk players